Ravon or RAVON may refer to:
 RAVON, German robot
 Ravon, Uzbekistan
 Romanticism and Victorianism on the Net (RaVoN), an online journal